The Goodere baronetcy, "of Burhope in the County of Hereford", was a title in the Baronetage of Great Britain. It was created on 5 December 1707 for Edward Goodere, of Burhope/Burghope House in the parish of Wellington, Herefordshire, later a Member of Parliament for Evesham and Herefordshire. His son, the second Baronet, was childless and devised his estates to his sister's children and not to his younger brother, Samuel Goodere. Samuel, a captain in the Royal Navy, had his brother murdered in revenge. Samuel, who nonetheless succeeded as third Baronet, was hanged for murder at Hot Wells, near Bristol, on 20 April 1741. Sir Edward's third son was killed in a duel. The title became extinct on the death of the fifth Baronet in 1809.

Goodere baronets, of Burhope (1707)
Sir Edward Goodere, 1st Baronet (1657–1739)
Sir John Dineley Goodere, 2nd Baronet (c. 1680–1741)
Sir Samuel Goodere, 3rd Baronet (styled "Samuel Goodere, Esq." or "Mr. Goodere" throughout his trial) (1687–1741)
Sir Edward Dineley-Goodere, 4th Baronet (1729–1761)
Sir John Dineley-Goodere, 5th Baronet (1729–1809)

Samuel Goodere's second wife was Elizabeth Watts of Llanvetherine, near Monmouth, Wales, who was the mother of his twin sons and several daughters.  His first daughter, by his first wife Jane Nicholls who was buried in Chapel Yard, Deal, kent in 1721, was Eleanor Goodere who married William Wyborn of Sholden, Kent.

References

Extinct baronetcies in the Baronetage of Great Britain